"Holding On (When Love Is Gone)" is a song by R&B/funk band L.T.D. Released as a single from their album, Togetherness, the song spent two weeks on top of the Billboard R&B singles chart in September 1978 and peaked at number 49 on the Billboard Hot 100.

References

1978 singles
1978 songs
L.T.D. (band) songs
A&M Records singles
Songs written by Jeffrey Osborne